Mark Noske (born 25 July 1975) is a former Australian racing car driver. He has scored round wins in various Australian championships including the Australian Drivers' Championship, the Australian Formula Ford Championship and the Australian Nations Cup Championship.

Formula Racing
The son of former 1980's Sprintcar and Group A racer Tony Noske, Mark started in Formula Ford in Australia in 1992 after three seasons of Karting finishing fourth in 1994 and third in 1995 championships. In 1997 and 1998, he entered the Formula Holden class finishing sixth and third respectively. He made a brief return in 2002 for two races only. He competed in the US Formula Ford 2000 series.

Touring/GT Racing
Noske raced for Allan Moffat Racing at the 1995 Bathurst 1000, Gibson Motorsport at the 1996 Sandown 500 and Bathurst 1000 and the Holden Racing Team in 1997/98. His only full season was in 1999 driving for the Holden Young Lions program. He continued as a co-driver for endurance events and was drafted into the vacant Lucas Dumbrell Motorsport seat for the remainder of the 2010 V8 Supercar Championship Series.

He tried GT racing in the Australian Nations Cup finishing third in 2000 and seventh in 2001, both years driving a Ferrari 360 Challenge for Prancing Horse Racing. In 2011 he stood in for an ill Jason Richards as a guest driver at the Australian Carrera Cup Championship third round in Townsville.

He has also done selected Production Car Racing mainly in long-distance events. His best finish was in the 1995 Eastern Creek 12 Hour finishing third driving a Porsche 911 RSCS.

Results

Career results

Complete Bathurst 1000 results

References

External links
Speedsport Magazine Race Driver Database: Mark Noske
VESRIX: Driver Profile: Mark Noske
Driver Database Stats: Mark Noske

1975 births
Living people
Supercars Championship drivers
Formula Holden drivers
Formula Ford drivers
People from Portland, Victoria
Racing drivers from Victoria (Australia)
Garry Rogers Motorsport drivers